The 1902–03 season was the 10th season in which Dundee competed at a Scottish national level, playing in Division One. In what would be their best season to date, Dundee finished in the league in 2nd place, finishing 6 points behind champions Hibernian. Dundee would also compete in the Scottish Cup, where they would progress to the semi-finals before losing in a replay to Hearts. This would be the first season where Dundee would wear dark blue uniforms as their definitive home colours, with their kit for the season being described as "dark blue semmets and pants, the latter being relieved with a nice red stripe down the side".

Scottish Division One 

Statistics provided by Dee Archive

League table

Scottish Cup 

Statistics provided by Dee Archive

Player Statistics 
Statistics provided by Dee Archive

|}

See also 

 List of Dundee F.C. seasons

References 

 

Dundee F.C. seasons
Dundee